Lejanías is a town and municipality in the Meta Department, Colombia.

Climate
Lejanías has a tropical rainforest climate (Köppen Af) with heavy to extremely heavy rainfall year round.

References

Municipalities of Meta Department